Eloy Rodriguez (born January 7, 1947) is an American biochemist. He is the James Perkins Professor of Environmental Studies at Cornell University. He was born in Edinburg, Texas.

Collaborating with primatologist Richard Wrangham, Rodriguez introduced the concept of zoopharmacognosy.

Rodriguez graduated from the University of Texas, Austin with a B.S. in 1969 and a Ph.D. in phytochemistry and plant biology in 1975. Later, at the University of British Columbia, he received medical postdoctoral training in medicinal botany. He was an assistant professor of ecology and evolutionary biology at the University of California, Irvine from 1976 to 1994 before joining the faculty at Cornell.

Other interests
Rodriguez, who is Mexican-American, also serves as a faculty advisor for the Science Organization of Latinos at Cornell.

Rodriguez is the director of the Cornell University Esbaran Amazon Field Laboratory located in the Amazon rainforest near Iquitos, Peru.

Rodriguez is the founder of the California Alliance for Minority Participation (CAMP) program funded by the National Science Foundation. As a result, the CAMP program spread from its home campus, University of California at Irvine, to the 9 other branches of the University of California.

Notes

External links
Profile at Cornell

1947 births
Living people
American academics of Mexican descent
21st-century American chemists
Cornell University faculty
People from Edinburg, Texas
Academic staff of the University of British Columbia
University of California, Irvine faculty
University of Texas at Austin College of Natural Sciences alumni